Iago Justen Maidana Martins (born 6 February 1996), known as Iago Maidana, is a Brazilian footballer who plays as a central defender for Campeonato Brasileiro Série A club América Mineiro.

Club career
Born in Cruz Alta, Rio Grande do Sul, Maidana finished his formation with Criciúma. He made his first team – and Série A – debut on 23 November 2014, starting in a 1–1 away draw against Flamengo.

On 7 September 2015 Maidana rescinded his contract with Criciúma, with the club still holding a percentage of his rights. Fifteen days later he joined São Paulo, who paid R$ 2 million for 60% of his rights to Monte Cristo EC.

On 5 January 2018, Maidana joined Atlético Mineiro on a season-long loan deal. A year later, he transferred on a permanent basis, signing a four-year contract with the club.

Maidana was sent on loan to Sport Recife for the 2020 season, in which he was the team's joint-top scorer with seven goals. On 9 March 2021, his loan was extended for an additional season. On 29 July, however, Sport released him from his contract due to financial difficulties.

On 23 August 2021, Maidana signed a season-long loan deal with Portuguese Primeira Liga side Gil Vicente. He made two Taça de Portugal appearances before leaving the club in December.

On 13 January 2022, Maidana joined América Mineiro on a two-year deal.

International career
On 15 May 2015 Maidana was included in Brazil under-20s' final list ahead of that year's FIFA U-20 World Cup.

Honours

Club
São Paulo
U-20 Copa Libertadores: 2016

Atlético Mineiro
Campeonato Mineiro: 2020

References

External links
Meu Time na Rede profile 

1996 births
Living people
Sportspeople from Rio Grande do Sul
Brazilian footballers
Brazilian expatriate footballers
Association football defenders
Campeonato Brasileiro Série A players
Campeonato Brasileiro Série B players
Brazil under-20 international footballers
Criciúma Esporte Clube players
São Paulo FC players
São Bernardo Futebol Clube players
Paraná Clube players
Clube Atlético Mineiro players
Sport Club do Recife players
Gil Vicente F.C. players
América Futebol Clube (MG) players
Brazilian expatriate sportspeople in Portugal
Expatriate footballers in Portugal